{{Automatic taxobox
| fossil_range = Miocene, 
| image = Hohhot.inner mongolia museum.Platybelodon grangeri.2.jpg
| image_caption = Platybelodon grangeri skeleton, Inner Mongolia Museum
| taxon = Platybelodon
| authority = Borissiak, 1928
| type_species = Platybelodon danovi
| type_species_authority = Borissiak, 1928
| subdivision_ranks = Species
| subdivision = *P. grangeri Osborn, 1929
P. beliajevae Alexeeva, 1971
P. tongxinensis Chen, 1978
P. tetralophus Wang and Li, 2022
}}Platybelodon ("flat-spear tusk") is an extinct genus of large herbivorous proboscidean mammals related to modern-day elephants. Species lived during the middle Miocene Epoch in Africa, Asia and the Caucasus.

PalaeobiologyPlatybelodon was previously believed to have fed in the swampy areas of grassy savannas, using its teeth to shovel up aquatic and semi-aquatic vegetation. However, wear patterns on the teeth suggest that it used its lower tusks to strip bark from trees, and may have used the sharp incisors that formed the edge of the "shovel" more like a modern-day scythe, grasping branches with its trunk and rubbing them against the lower teeth to cut it from a tree. Adult animals in particular might have eaten coarser vegetation more frequently than juveniles.

Images

See alsoGnathabelodonEubelodonSerbelodonAmebelodonKonobelodonTorynobelodon''

References

Further reading
Harry Cox, Colin Harrison, R.J.G. Savage, and Brian Gardiner. (1999): The Simon & Schuster Encyclopedia of Dinosaurs and Prehistoric Creatures: A Visual Who's Who of Prehistoric Life. Simon & Schuster.
Jordi Agusti and Mauricio Anton. (2002): Mammoths, Sabertooths, and Hominids. Pg.90, Columbia University Press.
Jayne Parsons.(2001): Dinosaur Encyclopedia. Pg.260, Dorling Kindersley.
David Norman. (2001): The Big Book Of Dinosaurs. Pg.420-421, Welcome Books.
Hazel Richardson.(2003): Dinosaurs and Other Prehistoric Animals (Smithsonian Handbooks). Pg.173, Dorling Kindersley.

External links

Amebelodontidae
Miocene proboscideans
Messinian genus extinctions
Miocene mammals of Africa
Miocene mammals of Asia
Miocene mammals of Europe
Prehistoric placental genera
Langhian genus first appearances
Fossil taxa described in 1928